Field of Crows is Fish's eighth solo studio album since he left Marillion in 1988 and the first since Fellini Days (2001). Released on Fish's own label Chocolate Frog Records, retail distribution is now handled by Snapper Music.

Track listing
"The Field" (Dick, Watson) – 8:42
"Moving Targets" (Dick, Watson, Duguid) – 5:46
"The Rookie" (Dick, Watson) – 5:35
"Zoo Class" (Dick, Watson, Duguid) – 5:23
"The Lost Plot" (Dick, Turrell) – 5:10
"Old Crow" (Dick, Watson, Duguid) – 5:20
"Numbers" (Dick, Watson, Usher) – 5:36
"Exit Wound" (Dick, Watson) – 5:55
"Innocent Party" (Dick, Watson, Duguid) – 7:37
"Shot The Craw" (Dick, Watson, Duguid) – 6:00
"Scattering Crows (Still Time)" (Dick, Watson, Turrell, Duguid) – 5:05

Personnel
 Fish (Derek W. Dick) – lead vocals
 Bruce Watson – guitars and e-bow
 Frank Usher – guitars, slide guitar
 Steve Vantsis – bass
 Mark Brzezicki – drums and percussion
 Tony Turrell – keyboards
 Dave Haswell – percussion
 Danny Gillan – backing vocals on 1,2,3,4,6,11
 Richard Sidwell – trumpet and flugel horn on 1,4,6,8,10
 Steve Hamilton – saxophone on 1,4,6,8,10
 Yatta, Lars K. Lande – "crowd" vocal on 1
 Irvin Duguid - clavinet on 6

Production
 Calum Malcolm – mastering
 Elliot Ness – producer, engineer, mixing
 Geoff Allan – assistant engineer
 Dave Axtell – artwork, design
 Mark Wilkinson – portraits
 Lars K. Lande – inside back photo

References

External links
 

2003 albums
2004 albums
Fish (singer) albums